The 2020 FanShield 500 was a NASCAR Cup Series race held on March 8, 2020, at Phoenix Raceway in Avondale, Arizona. Contested over 316 laps—extended from 312 laps due to an overtime finish, on the  oval, it was the fourth race of the 2020 NASCAR Cup Series season. This was the last race to run before the season was put on hold due to the COVID-19 pandemic.

Report

Background

The motorsport track opened in 1964 and currently hosts two NASCAR race weekends annually. PIR has also hosted the IndyCar Series, CART, USAC and the Rolex Sports Car Series. The raceway is currently owned and operated by International Speedway Corporation.

The race would be Kyle Larson's last race with Chip Ganassi Racing.

Entry list
 (R) denotes rookie driver.
 (i) denotes driver who are ineligible for series driver points.

Practice
Ryan Newman made a return to the race track as a visitor for the first time after his crash at the Daytona 500, where he was injured, three weeks earlier.

First practice

Final practice

Qualifying

Qualifying results

Race recap 

Before the race, for the O'Reilly Pre-Race Party, the Arizonian band Harry Luge Band would play a concert in the InField two hours before the race. Wrestler Anthony Robles would try and break the Guinness record for most pull ups with an 80 pound bag, which he succeeded. Country music star Blake Shelton and Pitbull would perform Get Ready and introduce drivers. Skylar Astin, star from "Zoey's Extraordinary Playlist", would sing the national anthem. Four F-35s from Luke Air Force Base would perform the fly over at the end of the national anthem. Hudson Derbyshire, son of the CEO of FanShield, Bryan (who accompanied him, along with his mom) would give out the starting command.

Stage One 
The start of the race showed pole sitter Chase Elliott pull out to the lead with Kevin Harvick following behind. Kyle Larson, in what would be his last race with Chip Ganassi Racing passed Harvick on lap 2. While the leaders were pulling away from each other, there were lots of battles for position in the midfield, including Martin Truex Jr. fighting his way up to the front after having to start at the rear. The traction compound poured on the track, PJ1, was a big factor throughout the race as it provided different grooves to run on. With around 40 laps to go in the stage, Denny Hamlin and Matt DiBenedetto were fighting for position. Also, Harvick had caught up to Elliott, and was battling him for the lead, and would keep fighting until lap 57, when Ricky Stenhouse Jr., trying to pass the lapped car of Joey Gase hit Gase's left quarter panel and spun into the wall, damaging the back end of his car.

During pit stops, all the lead lap cars decided to pit. Stenhouse was the leader coming off of pit road, but took no tires. Harvick would finally be able to grab the lead off of Elliott, with his crew having a faster time. Elliott would come up 2nd, then Hamlin in 3rd, DiBenedetto in fourth, and Logano rounding out the top 5.

During the lap 64 restart, Harvick would pull out to the lead; however, this would be short lived, as while Hamlin was battling for position, Hamlin's car got loose and went up the racetrack, collecting the nearby cars of Brad Keselowski and Ryan Blaney and sending all three into the outside wall. Keselowski would not suffer much damage, contrary to his teammate, Blaney who had to retire from the race. Hamlin would also be plagued with damage.

With a 4 lap dash to the end of the stage, Harvick and Elliott would duke it out, with Logano following closely behind. However, Harvick would pull out the lead and win the stage. Meanwhile, Erik Jones would win the final stage points in a tough battle with Clint Bowyer.

Race

Stage Results

Stage One
Laps: 75

Stage Two
Laps: 115

Final Stage Results

Stage Three
Laps: 122

Race statistics
 Lead changes: 20 among 7 different drivers
 Cautions/Laps: 12 for 73
 Red flags: 0
 Time of race: 3 hours, 20 minutes and 50 seconds
 Average speed:

Media

Television
Fox Sports covered their 16th race at the Phoenix Raceway. Mike Joy and two-time Phoenix winner Jeff Gordon called the race from the broadcast booth, the last time Fox would have commentators in the booth at the track for the season, and the last for either of NASCAR's television partners until the Charlotte road course race. Jamie Little, Regan Smith, Vince Welch and Matt Yocum handled the pit road duties. Larry McReynolds and Jamie McMurray provided insight from the Fox Sports studio in Charlotte.

Radio
MRN covered the radio action for the race which was also simulcasted on Sirius XM NASCAR Radio. Alex Hayden, Jeff Striegle, and 1989 NASCAR Winston Cup Champion Rusty Wallace called the race when the field raced past the start/finish line. Kurt Becker called the action from turns 1 & 2 and Dan Hubbard called the action from turns 3 & 4. Pit lane was manned by Kim Coon, Steve Post, and Dillon Welch.

Standings after the race

Drivers' Championship standings

Manufacturers' Championship standings

Note: Only the first 16 positions are included for the driver standings.

References

2020 in sports in Arizona
2020 NASCAR Cup Series
March 2020 sports events in the United States
NASCAR races at Phoenix Raceway